Hans Povel (born c. 1954) is a retired Dutch rower who won three medals at the World Lightweight Rowing Championships in 1977–1979 in the coxless fours and coxed eights.

References

Living people
Dutch male rowers
People from Bloemendaal
World Rowing Championships medalists for the Netherlands
Year of birth missing (living people)
Sportspeople from North Holland
20th-century Dutch people
21st-century Dutch people